Manduria Airfield is a World War II airfield in Italy, located approximately 5 km north of Manduria, and about 390 km east-southeast of Naples. It was used by the United States Army Air Force Twelfth Air Force and later Fifteenth Air Force B-24 Liberator heavy bomber airfield.

 HQ 47th Bombardment Wing, 1 October 1943 – 15 May 1945
 68th Tactical Reconnaissance Group, November 1943-April 1944, (Various Photo-Reconnaissance Aircraft)
 98th Bombardment Group, 19 December 1943 – 17 January 1944, B-24 Liberator

In aerial imagery, the main runway, taxiways and many dispersal pads are clearly evident.

References

 Maurer, Maurer. Air Force Combat Units of World War II. Maxwell AFB, Alabama: Office of Air Force History, 1983. .

External links

Airfields of the United States Army Air Forces in Italy
Airports established in 1943